Rote is a census-designated place located in Lamar Township in southern Clinton County, Pennsylvania, United States. As of the 2010 census, the population was 507.

Rote is located near the center of Lamar Township in southern Clinton County, along Pennsylvania Route 477 near the northeastern end of the Nittany Valley. PA 477 leads west  to U.S. Route 220 at Cedar Springs, and east  to Exit 185 on Interstate 80 near Loganton.

References

External links

Census-designated places in Clinton County, Pennsylvania
Census-designated places in Pennsylvania